Huracan is the hurricane god of Maya mythology. In modern Spanish, huracán means hurricane.

Huracán may also refer to:
ARM Huracán, a Mexican Navy missile boat
Huracan (Belantis), a Gerstlauer Euro-Fighter model roller coaster at Belantis amusement park
Huracán (telenovela), a Mexican telenovela
Lamborghini Huracán, an automobile produced by Lamborghini
El Huracan, album by Steve Jordan (accordionist)

Sports
Club Atlético Huracán, Argentine football club
 Huracán Buceo, Uruguayan football club
Huracán de Comodoro Rivadavia, Argentine football club
Huracán Corrientes, Argentine football club
Huracán de San Rafael, Argentine football club
Huracán de Tres Arroyos, Argentine football club
Huracán Ramírez a famous Mexican luchador
Huracán Valencia Club de Fútbol, Spanish football club 
Huracán de Medellin, Colombian football club
Huracán FC, Puerto Rican football club
Huracán F.C., Uruguayan football club
Huracán Valencia CF, Spanish football club
AD Huracán, Spanish football club
CD Huracán Z, Spanish football club the